Westminster station is a Regional Transportation District (RTD) commuter rail station on the B Line in Westminster, Colorado, part of the Denver metropolitan area. The station opened on July 25, 2016, and became the interim northern terminus of the B Line until extensions north toward Boulder and Longmont are built.

The station consists of a single platform on the north side is situated on the south side of the tracks. It will have a 350-stall park and ride that can be expanded to 1,000 spaces and a public plaza, both located on the north side of the tracks. The station is connected to the nearby Adams County residential neighborhood by a  pedestrian bridge over the tracks, platform, and nearby Little Dry Creek. The underpass of the station, connecting to the north plaza, is home to a  art installation by Brian W. Brush called "Grotto", which consists of high-density polyethylene plastic tubes lit by LED lights in an array of colors.

The City of Westminster plans to encourage transit-oriented development in a  area around the station; a  park and open space is also planned for the south side of the station area.

References

RTD commuter rail stations
2016 establishments in Colorado
Railway stations in the United States opened in 2016